UBBA is a Swedish trallpunk band that started in Easter 1999 in Köping, by Mart Hällgren and David Stark.

Mart Hällgren (popularly known as Total Egon), and David Stark (Dadde) used to played together in the band "Sunday Morning Einsteins", and in Autumn 1998, they decided to leave the band and start a new one, focused on trallpunk. During several months, they were looking for the other two members, and, in spring 1999, Puttra and Marja were selected as lead and second guitar.

During their first shows, the band was called "For The Family"; but the band soon changed its name to UBBA, meaning "Without B, Just A". They also used the names "UBBA·T", and "UBBA-Teens". The names are an obvious spoof of Swedish pop bands ABBA and ABBA-Teens (A-Teens); which they often parodied in several of his official photos. During that year, they released an EP called "1972".

By the end of 1999, the band had their first nationwide mini-tour with the band "Charta 77". In April 2000; they released their debut album "The U-Generation", their most known album to date; which is a complete parody of A-Teens' debut album The ABBA Generation. By the end of 2000, Viktor Lindström entered the band, replacing Marja.

Around 2003, UBBA ceased to play actively, although they have never announced their official division. Mart Hällgren continued to play with his own band "Total Egon", David Stark joined Wolfbrigade (left in 2012), "To What End?" and became a member of Asta Kask in 2004, Viktor Lindström continued in "The Pipelines", which later became "The Holiday Fun Club", and Puttra allegedly decided to retire from music, and plays punk and rock covers with a bunch of friends only.

Discography
Extended Plays:
1999 - 1972 EP
Studio albums:
2000 - The U-Generation
2002 - Slag Under Bältet

Singles:
1972 - 1999
UBBA*TEENS - 1999
Separator - 1999
Slag Under Bältet ("Battle Under The Belt") - 2002

Musical groups established in 1999
Musical groups disestablished in 2003
Musical quartets
Swedish comedy musicians
Parody musicians
Swedish parodists
1999 establishments in Sweden
Swedish punk rock groups